My Gift to You is the first and only Christmas album by American recording artist Alexander O'Neal, released on 	November 11, 1988 by Tabu Records.

On release, the album was received favorably by the majority of music critics. However, it was not very successful, peaking at No. 149 on the Billboard 200 and reached No. 54 on Top R&B/Hip-Hop Albums. The album only launched one charting single in the UK. "The Christmas Song"/"Thank You for a Good Year" which peaked at No. 30 on the UK Singles Chart.

Critical reception
In a retrospective review, Jason Ankeny of AllMusic gave the album three out of five stars and wrote that "My Gift to You is plainly a product of its era, complete with thick synthesizers and programmed rhythms, and is best enjoyed by listeners still hoping Santa brings them acid-washed jeans and Members Only jackets regardless of the year in question."

Track listing

Personnel

 Alexander O'Neal – arranger; vocal arrangement; vocals  
 Jimmy Jam – arranger; associate producer; choir arrangement; drums; executive producer; horns; keyboard programming; keyboards; percussion; piano; producer; rhythm; string arrangements  
 Terry Lewis – arranger; associate producer; bass; choir arrangement; executive producer; guitar; horns; percussion; rhythm; string arrangements; backing vocals 
 Thomas McElroy – drum programming; drums; keyboards; producer
 Denzil Foster – drum programming; keyboards 
 Jellybean Johnson – guitar; percussion  
 David Agent – guitar
 Ira D. Conley – bass; bass (vocal) 
 Lee Blaskey – arranger; conductor; orchestra production
 Michael L. Bowens – saxophone (tenor); tenor (vocal) 
 Robert Edwards – saxophone (tenor); tenor (vocal)
 Terrence Frierson – saxophone (tenor); tenor (vocal) 
 Dorothy Cates – soprano (vocal)
 Shirley Marie Graham – alto; alto (vocals) 
 Carrie M. Harrington – alto; alto (vocals)  
 Gary Hines – choir arrangement; director   
 Wendy Ingram – soprano; soprano (vocal)  
 Valerie Johnson – soprano; soprano (vocal)  
 Lisa Keith – arranger; vocal arrangement; backing vocals
 Jennifer L. – alto (vocals)  
 Patricia Lacy – alto (vocals)   
 Renee McCall – soprano; soprano (vocal)  
 Otis Montgomery – saxophone (tenor); tenor (vocal)  
 Jayn Bell Porter – soprano; soprano (vocal)  
 Randy Ran – backing vocals  
 Charles Robinson – bass; bass (vocal)  
 Alecia Russell – alto  
 Aleeta D. Russell – alto (vocals)  
 Sounds of Blackness – choir; chorus  
 Jennifer Whitlock – alto; alto (vocals)  
 David B. Young – bass; bass (vocal)

Chart performance

References

External links
 

Alexander O'Neal albums
1988 Christmas albums
Christmas albums by American artists
Tabu Records albums
Albums produced by Jimmy Jam and Terry Lewis
Contemporary R&B Christmas albums